Kisona is a town in Wangdue Phodrang District in central Bhutan.

References

External links 
Satellite map at Maplandia.com

Populated places in Bhutan